Bus 174 is a 2002 Brazilian documentary film. It is the directorial debut of director José Padilha and co-director Felipe Lacerda.

Overview
In 2000, Sandro do Nascimento, a young man from a poor background, held passengers on a bus hostage for four hours. The event was caught live on television. The movie examines the incident and what life is like in the slums and favelas of Rio de Janeiro and how the criminal justice system in Brazil treats the lower classes.  Within the film, Padilha interviews former and current street children, members of the Rio police force, the Rio BOPE police team, family members, and sociologists in order to gain insight into what led Nascimento to carry out the hijacking.

People involved
Sandro
Julieta (aunt)
Dona Elza (adopted mother)
Janaina (hostage)
Willians (hostage)
Lucianna (hostage)
Luciana (hostage)
Daviana (hostage)
Geisa (hostage)
Soares (sociologist)
Yvonne (social worker)

Distribution
Bus 174s distribution was supported mainly by U.S. distributor Cinemax Reel Life (HBO), and ThinkFilm. With the rise of U.S. distribution companies in Brazil, some say that domestic success of the film hinged on their support or that of Gob Filmes, a film production company founded in 1990 by Globo Television Networks.

After its release in 2002 at the São Paulo Film Festival, Bus 174 was shown around the world, in many films festivals from Rio de Janeiro to Netherlands, and the Philippines. It received critical acclaim, and was presented with awards such as the 2004 Peabody Award and the Amnesty Award, in the Netherlands.

The film has also been featured as an Official Selection at the multiple film festivals including:

 Palm Springs (2004)
 Vancouver (2003)
 Sundance (2003)
 Starz Denver (2003)
 Sydney (2003)
 San Francisco (2003)

Reception
Bus 174 was voted "one of the ten best films of the year" by The New York Times. It has won over 23 prizes worldwide, including an Emmy Award for Outstanding Cultural & Artistic Programming in 2005 (after being shown on HBO/Cinemax with great success), and the Amnesty Award in the Netherlands and a Peabody Award.

On the review aggregator website Rotten Tomatoes, the film holds an approval rating of 96%, based on 79 reviews, with an average rating of 8.2/10. The website's consensus reads, "Bus 174 uses real-life tragedy as the grist for a gripping -- and terribly thought-provoking -- look at societal tensions and police violence." On Metacritic, the film has a weighted average score of 83 out of 100, based on 27 critics, indicating "universal acclaim".

See also
 Sandro Rosa do Nascimento
 Candelária massacre
 List of hostage crises
 Last Stop 174

References

External links
 
 
 

2002 documentary films
2002 films
Brazilian documentary films
Films about hijackings
Films directed by José Padilha
Films set in Rio de Janeiro (city)
Films shot in Rio de Janeiro (city)
Films about buses
2000s Portuguese-language films
Peabody Award-winning broadcasts
2002 directorial debut films